Day 6 is a Canadian  radio program hosted by Brent Bambury, which airs Saturdays on CBC Radio One. The show presents a mix of the week's stories, including both news and cultural or entertainment topics, predominantly through interviews.

At the end of each episode, the program presents a "Riffed from the Headlines" segment, in which clips from three songs are spliced together as a clue to a news story from the previous week to which listeners are invited to send in guesses. This feature was retained from a similar segment in Bambury's prior series Go.

The program debuted on September 11, 2010, in the time slot formerly held by Go.

References

External links
Day 6

CBC Radio One programs
Canadian talk radio programs
2010 radio programme debuts